"International Philosophy", commonly referred to as the Philosophers' Football Match, is a Monty Python sketch depicting a football match in the Munich Olympiastadion between philosophers representing Greece and Germany. Starring in the sketch are Archimedes (John Cleese), Socrates (Eric Idle), Hegel (Graham Chapman), Nietzsche (Michael Palin), Marx (Terry Jones), and Kant (Terry Gilliam). Palin also provides the match television commentary.

The footage opens with the banner headline "International Philosophy", and Palin providing the narrative. Confucius is the referee and keeps times with an hourglass. St. Thomas Aquinas and St. Augustine (sporting haloes) serve as linesmen. The German manager is Martin Luther. The match is designed as a World Cup for the most well-known western philosophers made global with Confucius arbitrating the match. As play begins, the philosophers break from their proper football positions only to walk around on the pitch as if deeply pondering, and in some cases declaiming their theories. Franz Beckenbauer, the sole genuine footballer on the pitch and a "surprise inclusion" in the German team, is left more than a little confused.

Despite being set in the Olympiastadion, the sketch was instead filmed in Munich's Grünwalder Stadion. It originally featured in the second Monty Python's Fliegender Zirkus episode broadcast on 18 December 1972 and was regularly screened at the group's live shows, including Monty Python Live at the Hollywood Bowl (1982) and Monty Python Live (Mostly) (2014).

The Greek players, mostly with long grey beards and hair, play in togas, while the Germans sport a variety of period dress including Victorian frock coats and breeches. "Nobby" Hegel carries a grey top hat, while Beckenbauer wears the red and white of the 1972 Bayern Munich football strip.

Outcome

Nietzsche is booked with a yellow card for arguing with the referee, claiming Confucius has no free will, and Confucius, he says: "Name go in book".

In the second half, with nothing being accomplished on the field other than contemplation, Karl Marx is noticed warming up vigorously on the German sidelines. Marx soon races onto the field to substitute Ludwig Wittgenstein, his energy appearing as an obvious game-changer. Upon the referee's restart, Marx simply pulls up and starts meandering in deep thought like the rest.

With just over a minute of the match remaining Archimedes cries out "Eureka!", takes the first kick of the ball and rushes towards the German goal. After several passes through a perplexed German defence, Socrates scores the only goal of the match in a diving header off a cross from Archimedes.

As the sketch closes, the Germans dispute the call, as the match commentator says: "Hegel is arguing that the reality is merely an a priori adjunct of non-naturalistic ethics, Kant via the categorical imperative is holding that ontologically it exists only in the imagination, and Marx is claiming it was offside." The replay proves that, according to the offside rule, Socrates was indeed offside, but the sketch, nevertheless, states that the Greeks have won.

The names of the Greek philosophers in the line-up are displayed in German in the sketch. Despite the sketch, Wittgenstein was in fact Austrian and not German, while Empedocles of Acragas and Archimedes lived in Sicily. Supporting the main referee Confucius as linesmen were St Augustine and St Thomas Aquinas who were Roman African and Italian respectively.

Match details

Philosophers Football Match 2010

Inspired by the famous Monty Python sketch, and with the full backing of the surviving Pythons, a tribute/replay of The Philosophers' Football Match was held in North London, at Wingate & Finchley's Harry Abrahams Stadium, Finchley on 9 May 2010.

This tongue-in-cheek re-staging—on a real London pitch—of the original sketch, was the idea of The Philosophy Shop, a specialist provider of education and training for primary school children. The group works to enable Philosophy graduates at University level to conduct practical philosophy sessions for children aged 5 to 11 as part of a drive to boost their reasoning skills from their first days in the school environment.

Philosophers A. C. Grayling and former England Manager Graham Taylor had been appointed as managers for the event, and players included comedians Mark Steel, Tony Hawks, Arthur Smith, and Ariane Sherine, as well as philosophers Julian Baggini, Nigel Warburton, Simon Glendinning, Stephen Law, Angie Hobbs, and Mark Vernon, plus other academics from universities nationwide. Match supporters included sociologist and BBC Radio 4's Thinking Allowed presenter Laurie Taylor, the BBC's John Humphrys, and educationalist and author Anthony Seldon.

References

External links
 
 

Monty Python sketches
1972 Summer Olympics
Cultural depictions of philosophers
Sports fiction
Association football culture